The Ireland women's cricket team toured the Netherlands in August 2011. They played the Netherlands in 2 Twenty20 Internationals, winning the series 2–0. The series followed the 2011 Women's European Championship, which was also held in the Netherlands.

Squads

WT20I Series

1st T20I

2nd T20I

References

External links
Ireland Women tour of Netherlands 2011 from Cricinfo

Ireland women's cricket team tours
International cricket tours of the Netherlands
International cricket competitions in 2011
2011 in women's cricket